Maurice O'Connell (June 1803 – 18 June 1853) was one of seven children (the eldest of four sons) of the Irish Nationalist leader Daniel and Mary O'Connell. He served in British Parliament as Member of Parliament (MP) for Tralee from 1832 to 1837, and from 1838 until his death.

O'Connell attended Miss Everina Wollstonecraft's school, Dublin, in 1810, Edward Whyte's school, Dublin, in 1813, Clongowes Wood College in 1815, Trinity College, Dublin, in 1819, and King's Inns in 1821.

In 1832 he married Mary, daughter of Bindon Scott of County Clare, and they had several  children. The marriage was unhappy and Maurice is said to have had numerous affairs; some of the stories of his father's womanising are said to be based on Maurice's actions. His conduct, combined with chronic ill-health, wrecked his political career. Though described as "frank, popular and enthusiastic" he never lived up to the hopes his father and others had for him.

In 1834 he held the position of Director of the National Bank of Ireland.

His brothers John, Morgan and Daniel were also MPs.

See also
 O'Connell of Derrynane

Sources 

Erin I. Bishop, The World of Mary O'Connell, 1778–1836 (Lilliput Press, Dublin, 1999), p. 15

Citations

External links
 
  (part 1)
  (part 2)

1803 births
1853 deaths
UK MPs 1831–1832
UK MPs 1832–1835
UK MPs 1835–1837
UK MPs 1837–1841
UK MPs 1841–1847
UK MPs 1847–1852
Maurice
Place of birth missing
Members of the Parliament of the United Kingdom for County Clare constituencies (1801–1922)
Members of the Parliament of the United Kingdom for County Kerry constituencies (1801–1922)
Irish Repeal Association MPs